Acrocercops argyrodesma is a moth of the family Gracillariidae. It is known from New South Wales, Australia.

The larvae feed on Grevillea linearis. They probably mine the leaves of their host plant.

References

argyrodesma
Moths of Australia
Moths described in 1882